Jenny Bruce (also known as Ghoste) is an American singer, songwriter, and musician. She has shared the stage with John Oates, Sophie B. Hawkins, Vanessa Carlton, and Avril Lavigne, among others.  Her songs have been featured in The Ghost Whisperer, Six Degrees, King of the Hill, Meet My Folks, Dawson's Creek, among others.  In 2001 her song, Amsterdam, won first place for Best Pop Song, in The Billboard Songwriting Contest.

Early life and education
Jenny Bruce was born in New York, New York (November 14, 1966) to parents Duncan and Tamara (née Kahan) Bruce. Her father, Duncan Archibald Bruce, was an author and her mother was a writer.

Bruce taught herself to play the piano at age five when she wrote her first song, and later taught herself to play the guitar in her early twenties.  She attended the all-girls Chapin School in New York, New York from grades 1-12.  During high school she became the class pianist and also performed in musical theater.

She attended Barnard College in New York, New York and completed her junior year in Paris, as part of Columbia University’s Reid Hall program where she also began working as a jazz singer and waitress at The Hollywood Savoy. She joined the band, SAY which received radio airplay and had a local following. In 1990, Bruce returned to New York and finished her senior year at Barnard College, and holds a bachelor's degree in European History and a minor in French Translation.  Bruce is fluent in French and English.

Music career 
During her junior year in college in 1987, while studying abroad in Paris, Bruce began performing in nightclubs and restaurants.  She joined the French band, SAY which garnered airplay and had a local following.  Upon returning to New York, New York, she began performing in clubs and festivals  and started writing songs for her first album titled, Jenny Bruce.

1990s
Bruce released her debut, self-titled album, Jenny Bruce in 1997.  Tracks, "Music to My Ears", was featured in Dawson's Creek.

2000s
Bruce created a local following in New York and performed at clubs and festivals as well as opening concerts for Sophie B. Hawkins, Gavin Degraw, and Avril Lavigne, among others.  She garnered a following and continued writing songs and released four more albums.

In 2001, she released, Soul on Fire and she was approached by a Los Angeles publishing company to license her songs in film and television which successfully placed many of her songs in major network television shows.

In 2006, Bruce released, Left of July.

2010s
Bruce took a break from her music career beginning in 2005 citing, 
 “It's such a long story.  To sum it up, I didn't write for myself for over a decade.  I Bottled everything up and  locked it up in a jar.  Especially the feelings of loss after my mother died.  That loss broke my heart and hurt so much that I kind of shut down.  Thing is, I became a mother around the same time. It was a very confusing period in my life.  These songs are little life rafts that I wrote to pull myself up and out of a numbing sea"

Bruce released, Firefly in a Jar in 2015.

2020s
In January, 2020, Bruce released the album, Ghoste.

Awards
In 2001, Bruce won 1st place for Best Pop Song in the Billboard International Songwriting Contest.  She was invited to perform and accept her award at Nashville's Bluebird Cafe where she was awarded an arch top guitar.

|-
|  || Deep Water || CCVM Best New Song Scholarship || 
|-
|  || Make It Right || Songwriters Hall of Fame Award|| 
|-
|  || Amsterdam || Billboard Songwriting Contest || 
|-

Songs in Film & Television

Discography
 1997 - Jenny Bruce
 2001 - Soul on Fire
 2006 - Left of July
 2015 - Firefly in a Jar
 2020 - Ghoste

References

1966 births
Living people
20th-century American women singers
21st-century American women singers
American women singer-songwriters
20th-century American singers